Diego Cammarata (born 27 March 1951) is an Italian politician.

He was member of The People of Freedom Party. He has served as Mayor of Palermo from 2001 to 2012. He was provincial coordinator of Forza Italia from 1996 to 2001. He was elected president of Associazione Nazionale Comuni Italiani in Sicily on 22 July 2008.

He resigned as mayor of Palermo in January 2012, a few months before the natural expiry.

Biography
Diego Cammarata was born in Palermo, Italy on 1951. He has been a professor of information and communication law and of image promotion theory and technique at the University of Palermo.

See also
 List of mayors of Palermo

References

External links
 Diego Cammarata on Openpolis

Living people
1951 births
Jurists from Palermo
The People of Freedom politicians
21st-century Italian politicians
20th-century Italian politicians
Mayors of Palermo
20th-century Italian lawyers
Academic staff of the University of Palermo